Les Loges-Marchis is a commune in the Manche department in Normandy in north-western France.

History
The village was badly affected by the French Dysentery Epidemic of 1779 such that 250 died and the graveyard had to be extended this may be the origin of the five crosses (Les Cinq Croix).

See also
Communes of the Manche department

References

Logesmarchis